Polyrhachis philippinensis is a species of ant that is endemic to the Philippines.

References
Baltazar, C.R. 1966. A catalogue of Philippine Hymenoptera (with a bibliography, 1758-1963). Pacific Insects Monographs 8: 1-488. (page 277, listed)
Emery, C. 1925d.  Hymenoptera. Fam. Formicidae. Subfam. Formicinae. Genera Insectorum 183: 1-302 (page 201, Combination in P. (Myrma))
Smith, F. 1858b. Catalogue of hymenopterous insects in the collection of the British Museum. Part VI. Formicidae. London: British Museum, 216 pp. (page 69, pl. 4, fig. 34 worker described)

References based on Global Ant Biodiversity Informatics
Ashmead W. H. 1904. A list of the Hymenoptera of the Philippine Islands, with descriptions of new species. J. N. Y. Entomol. Soc. 12:1-22.
Robson Simon Database Polyrhachis -05 Sept 2014
Wheeler W. M. 1909. Ants of Formosa and the Philippines. Bulletin of the American Museum of Natural History 26: 333-345.

References

Formicinae
Insects described in 1858